Gifford Hill may refer to:

 Gifford Hill (Oneida County, New York), an elevation in Oneida County, New York
 Gifford Hill (Onondaga County, New York), an elevation in Onondaga County, New York
 Gifford Hill (Otsego County, New York), an elevation in Otsego County, New York